Perry-Spruill House, also known as Spruill House, is a historic home located at Plymouth, Washington County, North Carolina. It was built between 1882 and 1884, and is a -story, three bay, Gothic Revival style frame cottage. It has a high hipped roof with intersecting cross gables ornamented with inverted fleur-de-lys sawnwork, a full-width front porch, pointed Gothic windows, and is sheathed in weatherboard.

It was listed on the National Register of Historic Places in 1985.  It is located in the Plymouth Historic District.

References

Houses on the National Register of Historic Places in North Carolina
Gothic Revival architecture in North Carolina
Houses completed in 1884
Houses in Washington County, North Carolina
National Register of Historic Places in Washington County, North Carolina
Historic district contributing properties in North Carolina